The Kreissle Forge (also known as the Kreissle Forge and Ornamental Iron Works) is a historic site in Sarasota, Florida, United States. It is located at 7947 Tamiami Trail. On December 2, 1996, it was added to the U.S. National Register of Historic Places.

References

External links

 Manatee County listings at National Register of Historic Places

National Register of Historic Places in Manatee County, Florida
Buildings and structures in Sarasota, Florida